The Severomorsk Disaster was a deadly series of munitions fires that resulted in the detonation and destruction of large amounts of munitions that lasted from May 13 to 17, 1984, within the Okolnaya naval munitions depot, near the Severomorsk Naval Base (headquarters of the Northern Fleet of the Soviet Navy). The detonation occurred in the Northern Russian "closed" town of Severomorsk, over 900 miles (1,448.4 kilometers) from the Russian capital Moscow.

Munitions had reportedly detonated after a fire started on May 13, which thus caused a massive chain of explosions on May 17, and resulted in the deaths of at least 200–300 people, and the destruction of at least 900 of the Northern Fleet's missiles and torpedoes.

Most of the dead were allegedly ordnance technicians "sent into the fire in a desperate but unsuccessful effort to defuse or disassemble munitions before they exploded", according to the New York Times.

Background
The town of Severomorsk has long had history with the armed forces of both the Soviet Union and the Russian Federation, a history that dates to before the Second World War. It is a history in part signified by the presence of at least two Russian military airbases within  of the town, as well as a naval base and its munitions depot (the Okolnaya naval munitions depot), as well as serving as the main administrative base of the Northern Fleet.

At the time of the disaster, the Northern Fleet was believed to have an aircraft carrier, 148 cruisers, destroyers and other warships, and 190 of the navy's 371 submarines, of which two were apparently stationed at the munitions depot.

Incident

On May 13, 1984, a fire started in the Okolnaya munitions depot on the outskirts of Severomorsk, the cause of which allegedly was the fact that munitions had been stored too close together. On May 17, the fire caused the detonation of the munitions at the depot. For about an hour and a half, sporadic blasts occurred at the supply depot, that resulted in the deaths of between 200–300 people, most of whom were ordnance technicians that had been "sent into the fire in a desperate but unsuccessful effort to defuse or disassemble munitions before they exploded", according to The New York Times. Dozens of local civilians began to evacuate their apartments and head to the hills, as the blast was allegedly so powerful that it was first thought a nuclear accident had occurred.
The blast and the evacuation were described on a Russian navy blog:

Reporting and aftermath
One of the first mentions of the incident in the media was, reportedly, an article published on July 10 of the same year by the newly established British non-fiction military weekly magazine, Jane's Defence Weekly (JDW), which claimed that it had obtained the information from "Western intelligence sources."

See also
 List of Russian military accidents

References

Explosions in 1984
Severomorsk
May 1984 events in Europe
1984 disasters in Russia
Explosions in Russia
1984 in the Soviet Union
Disasters in the Soviet Union
Soviet Navy
1984 disasters in the Soviet Union